The White Ship is a 2002 novel by Australian children's author Jackie French. The White Ship follows the journey of a group of Protestant children who are forced to flee their home, an island off the coast of France, upon a defecting warship known as "The White Ship" in 1572, after Catherine de' Medici orders the deaths of all French Huguenots.

Novels by Jackie French
2002 Australian novels
HarperCollins books
Fiction set in the 1570s